The Tasmantid hotspot is a volcanic hotspot located in the South Pacific Ocean. Due to plate tectonics the hotspot was under different parts of the seabed in the past. It was initially centred under what is now the southern Coral Sea 60 million years ago where the first Tasmantid volcano was created. As the Indo-Australian Plate continued to drift northwards the hotspot was positioned in the northern Tasman Sea 20 million years ago, eventually reaching its current location east of Tasmania in response to ongoing northward plate motion.

The northward movement of the Indo-Australian Plate over the last 60 million years coupled with volcanism of the Tasmantid hotspot has resulted in a north-south line of submarine volcanoes called the Tasmantid Seamount Chain. This includes over 10 seamounts, the youngest of which is the seven million year old Gascoyne Seamount.

The Tasmantid hotspot may have created the Louisiade Plateau, a supposed large igneous province at the northern end of the Tasmantid Seamount Chain.

References

Hotspots of the Pacific Ocean
Tasman Sea
Seismic zones